Nokuzola Gladys Tolashe, also known as Sisisi "Sisi" Tolashe, is a South African politician and a Member of Parliament (MP) for the African National Congress. In March 2023, she was appointed as  Deputy Minister in the Presidency responsible for Women, Youth and Persons with Disabilities.

Political career
On 5 September 2016, Tolashe was sworn in as an ANC Member of Parliament in the National Assembly. She replaced Raesibe Eunice Nyalungu, who died. During her first term in the National Assembly, she served on the  Portfolio Committee on Agriculture, Forestry and Fisheries, the Portfolio Committee on Labour, the  Portfolio Committee on Communications. She resigned from the National Assembly on 25 February 2018 and Daniel Jabu Kabini took her seat. On 26 February 2018, she was elected as the Executive Mayor of the Enoch Mgijima Local Municipality.

Tolashe was elected back to the National Assembly in the 2019 general election from the ANC's Eastern Cape list. She served on the Standing Committee on Public Accounts and the Committee for Section 194 Enquiry. In 2020, she served as chair of the Ad Hoc Committee on the appointment of the Auditor-General.

National government
During a cabinet reshuffle on 6 March 2023, Tolashe was appointed as Deputy Minister in the Presidency responsible for Women, Youth and Persons with Disabilities by president Cyril Ramaphosa.

References

External links
Profile at Parliament of South Africa

Living people
Year of birth missing (living people)
Xhosa people
Members of the National Assembly of South Africa
Women members of the National Assembly of South Africa
African National Congress politicians
Mayors of places in South Africa